Beijing Bayi School, also known as the August 1st School, is a public elementary through high school with three campuses in Haidian District, Beijing.

Tetsushi Takahashi of Nikkei Shimbun wrote that Beijing Bayi School is "prestigious". Evan Osnos of New Yorker wrote that the "exclusive" Beijing Bayi School was known as the "cradle of leaders".

History
Nie Rongzhen established the school in 1947.

Campuses

The school has three campuses: Main, North, and Elementary.

The original campus was in a building that previously functioned as a residence for a prince who lived in the Qing Dynasty.

Student body and student culture
Takahashi stated that in the era prior to the Cultural Revolution, descendants of the leaders of the Chinese Communist Party, known as "second-generation reds", were enrolled at Beijing Bayi School.

Osnos wrote that in the pre-Cultural Revolution period the pupils "formed a small, close-knit élite; they lived in the same compounds, summered at the same retreats, and shared a sense of noblesse oblige."

Mi Hedu, author of The Red Guard Generation, wrote that pre-Cultural Revolution pupils "compared one another on the basis of whose father had a higher rank, whose father rode in a better car."

Notable alumni
 Xi Jinping - Attended at the elementary and junior high school levels, graduated in 1968
Khemmani Pholsena - Attended school in Beijing between 1963 and 1969,

References

Further reading

External links
 Beijing Bayi School 

High schools in Beijing
Public primary schools in China
Schools in Haidian District
1947 establishments in China
Educational institutions established in 1947